Secret Life of... is a British factual documentary show, which follows the lives of each show's subject, finding out more about what life is like for that being. Episodes are narrated by Martin Clunes.

Episodes

References 

2013 British television series debuts
2017 British television series endings
ITV documentaries
2010s British documentary television series
Television series by ITV Studios
English-language television shows